Spathacanthus hahnianus is a species of plant in the family Acanthaceae. It is found in Costa Rica, Guatemala, Honduras, Mexico, and Nicaragua. It is threatened by habitat loss. This species occurs in cloud forests and tropical rainforests, rarely in oak forests, and mostly around streams. It is found at elevations between 150 and 1,650 meters.

References

Acanthaceae
Conservation dependent plants
Taxa named by Henri Ernest Baillon
Taxonomy articles created by Polbot
Trees of Costa Rica
Trees of Guatemala
Trees of Honduras
Trees of Mexico
Trees of Nicaragua
Cloud forest flora of Mexico